Pamela Merchant Cole (born December 18, 1967) is a graphic designer and former Democratic member of the South Dakota Senate who represented the 7th district from 2009 to 2011. She was also the executive director of the South Dakota Democratic Party from 2020 to 2021.

Career
Cole was elected to the 7th district state senate seat in the 2008 election, beating Republican Orville B. Smidt. She served on the Commerce Committee, the Health and Human Service Committee and the Taxation Committee. She lost her seat at the 2010 election, being beaten by Larry Tidemann.

In 2016, she moved from Brookings to Sioux Falls. She was made the executive director of the South Dakota Democratic Party in February 2020, after the party leadership had resigned due to the party misstating its finances and finding itself in debt. In September 2020, Cole announced that the party had been "extremely frugal" in its recent spending and was once again financially stable. She resigned in February 2021 due to personal reasons.

In 2022, Cole filed to run for the at-large B seat on Sioux Falls city council as incumbent Christine Erickson was term limited. She lost to Rich Merkouris, a local pastor.

Electoral history

2008

2010

2022

Personal life
Cole married her husband Mike in 2018 and together they have a blended family of five adult children.

Notes

References

1967 births
Living people
American graphic designers
American women graphic designers
South Dakota State University alumni
Democratic Party South Dakota state senators
Women state legislators in South Dakota
21st-century American politicians
21st-century American women politicians